Korekiyo is a masculine Japanese given name. Notable people with the name include:

Korekiyo Otsuka (1884–1945), Japanese politician
, Japanese politician

Fictional characters 
, a character in the video game Danganronpa V3: Killing Harmony

Japanese masculine given names